The Ontario Sportsman Series is a Canadian stock car racing series, that tours across short tracks, both asphalt and dirt, across Ontario. The series is sanctioned by the National Stock Car Association.

The Series was founded in 2007, after NASCAR purchased CASCAR and discontinued the CASCAR Sportsman Series. Originally, Ontario Sportsman Series events featured a twin 50 lap format until 2011, when it was changed to a 100 lap feature format. In 2022, the Ontario Sportsman Series featured ten races across Ontario.

2023 Ontario Sportsman Series Schedule

2023 OSS Point Standings 

Series will commence on May 19th, 2023 at Delaware Speedway

2023 Ontario Sportsman Series Roster

Complete Schedule

Series champions

|-
! Year
! Champion
! Hometown
!
|-
!2023
|TBA
|TBA
|
|-
! 2022
| #19 Kevin Trevellin
| Belleriver, Ontario
|
|-
! 2021
| #18 Chad McGlynn
| Kitchener, Ontario
|
|-
! 2020
| No Champion
| Full season cancelled due to COVID-19 pandemic; two races held instead 
|
|-
! 2019 
| #4 Connor James
| Bradford, Ontario
|
|-
! 2018 
| #54 Steve Arrand [Co-Champion]  #54 Kevin Allen [Co-Champion]
| Alisa Craig, OntarioDrumbo, Ontario
|
|-
! 2017 
| #14 Brandt Graham (2)
| Orono, Ontario
|
|-
! 2016 
| #14 Brandt Graham (1)
| Orono, Ontario
|
|-
! 2015 
| #24 Brennan Didero 
| Ancaster, Ontario
|
|-
! 2014
| #81 Shawn McGlynn (5)
| Kitchener, Ontario 
|
|-
! 2013
| #81 Shawn McGlynn (4)
| Kitchener, Ontario
|
|-
! 2012
| #81 Shawn McGlynn (3)
| Kitchener, Ontario
|
|-
! 2011
| # 40 Jay Doerr (2)
| London, Ontario
|
|-
! 2010
| #40 Jay Doerr (1)
| London, Ontario
|
|-
! 2009
| #28 Steve Robblee (2)
| Dorchester, Ontario
|
|-
! 2008
| #81 Shawn McGlynn (1)
| Kitchener, Ontario
|
|-
! 2007
| #28 Steve Robblee (1)
| Dorchester, Ontario
|
|}

2022 Ontario Sportsman Series Schedule 

 Race 2 -Shortened due to weather. Called early due to weather
 Races 9 & 10 changed to Twin 40 lappers due to closure of Southern Ontario Motor Speedway

2021 Ontario Sportsman Series schedule

2020 Ontario Sportsman Series schedule 

*Full season cancelled due to COVID-19 Pandemic, two races held instead*

2019 Ontario Sportsman Series schedule 

*NASCAR Stars Ken Schrader, Kenny Wallace, & Norm Benning participated in the race at Full Throttle Motor Speedway, with Ken in Tim Tolton's No. 3, Kenny in Brandon Huras's No. 5, and Norm in the No. 6. Schrader finished in fifth place, Wallace in 16th, and Benning finished in seventh.

2018 Ontario Sportsman Series schedule

2017 Ontario Sportsman Series schedule

2016 Ontario Sportsman Series schedule

2015 Ontario Sportsman Series schedule

2014 Ontario Sportsman Series schedule

2013 Ontario Sportsman Series schedule

2012 Ontario Sportsman Series schedule

2011 Ontario Sportsman Series schedule 

*Race shortened due to rain

2010 Ontario Sportsman Series schedule 

*The first event at Mosport Speedway was postponed due to rain and run as a double header on August 7, 2010.

**Flamboro's October 2 event was run on October 16, 2010, instead

2009 Ontario Sportsman Series schedule

2008 Ontario Sportsman Series schedule

2007 Ontario Sportsman Series schedule

Ontario Sportsman Series under CASCAR (2000–2006)

2006 CASCAR Power Water Sportsman Series schedule

2005 CASCAR Power Water Sportsman Series schedule

2004 CASCAR Carquest Sportsman Series schedule

2003 CASCAR Carquest Sportsman Series schedule 

*Statistics not available for 2000, 2001, & 2002.

See also
 NASCAR Pinty's Series
 APC United Late Model Series
 OSCAAR – Ontario Stock Car Association of Asphalt Racers

References

External links
Official website

Stock car racing series
Auto racing series in Canada
Motorsport in Canada
Recurring sporting events established in 2007